Bernie is a 2011 American biographical black comedy crime film directed by Richard Linklater, and written by Linklater and Skip Hollandsworth. The film stars Jack Black, Shirley MacLaine and Matthew McConaughey. It is based on Hollandsworth's January 1998 article, "Midnight in the Garden of East Texas", published in Texas Monthly magazine. It explores the 1996 murder of 81-year-old millionaire Marjorie Nugent (MacLaine) in Carthage, Texas, by her 39-year-old companion, Bernhardt "Bernie" Tiede (Black).

The film received critical acclaim for its direction, accuracy in relation to the facts, "Town Gossips" element, and particular praise for Jack Black's performance.

Plot
In small-town Carthage, Texas, in 1996, local assistant mortician Bernie Tiede, a beloved member of the community, becomes the only friend of the wealthy, recently widowed Marjorie Nugent. The townsfolk consider her cold and unpleasant. Tiede, in his late 30s, and the elderly Nugent quickly become inseparable, frequently traveling and lunching together. Tiede's social life suffers because of Nugent's constant demands for his attention.

Tiede murders Nugent after growing weary of the emotional toll of her possessiveness and persistent nagging. For nine months, Tiede excuses her absence in the community with few questions while using her money to support local businesses and neighbors. Finally, Nugent's stockbroker uses Tiede's neglect of previously agreed-upon payments to enlist the help of her estranged family. This results in an authorized police search of her house, which concludes with the discovery of Nugent's corpse in a freezer chest.

The local district attorney, Danny Buck Davidson, charges Tiede with first-degree (premeditated) murder. Tiede is arrested and he soon confesses that he killed Nugent, while claiming her emotional abuse as a mitigating circumstance. Despite this confession, many citizens of Carthage still rally to Tiede's defense, with some asserting that Nugent deserved to die. Davidson successfully requests a change of venue to the town of San Augustine, 50 miles away, to avoid selecting a biased jury. Despite the absence of evidence of premeditation, Tiede is found guilty as charged and imprisoned for life.

Cast
 Jack Black as Bernie Tiede
 Shirley MacLaine as Marjorie "Margie" Nugent
 Matthew McConaughey as Danny Buck Davidson
 Brady Coleman as Scrappy Holmes
 Richard Robichaux as Lloyd Hornbuckle
 Rick Dial as Don Leggett
 Brandon Smith as Sheriff Huckabee
 Larry Jack Dotson as the Rev. Woodard
 Merrilee McCommas as Molly Freeman
 Mathew Greer as Carl Lawrence
 Gabriel Luna as Kevin Schneider
 Kay Epperson as Townsperson (spoke with Bernie in prison scene)
 Sonny Carl Davis as Townsperson

Production
The film was based on an article in Texas Monthly magazine by Skip Hollandsworth, who co-wrote the screenplay with Linklater. Principal photography took 22 days, during September–October 2010, in Bastrop, Smithville, Georgetown, Lockhart, Carthage, and Austin, Texas.

The film mixes documentary conventions with fictional elements. There are talking-head interviews with Carthage townspeople; some of the talking heads are actors, while some are townspeople playing themselves.

Linklater said the screenplay that he co-wrote with Skip Hollandsworth was a boring read, and that "the gossip element almost kept the film from being made, because it reads boring. I said, 'But they’ll be funny characters. I could just imagine the accents.'”

Release
The film's world premiere was as the opening-night film of the 2011 Los Angeles Film Festival. Millennium Entertainment released the film on April 27, 2012.

Reception

Critical response
On Rotten Tomatoes, the film has an 88% "Certified Fresh" rating, based on 166 reviews, with an average rating of 7.40/10. The site's critical consensus reads, "Richard Linklater's Bernie is a gently told and unexpectedly amusing true-crime comedy that benefits from an impressive performance by Jack Black". On Metacritic, the film has a 75 out of 100, based on 35 critics, indicating "generally favorable reviews".

Roger Ebert of the Chicago Sun-Times enjoyed the film, giving it 3.5 stars out of 4. He praised Black's performance as well as Linklater's direction, saying "His genius was to see Jack Black as Bernie Tiede."

Critic Jonathan Rosenbaum called the film a masterpiece, describing it as a companion piece to Linklater's 1998 film The Newton Boys, and saying the writing is: 
so good that the humor can’t be reduced to simple satire; a whole community winds up speaking through the film, and it has a lot to say. In fact, it’s hard to think of many other celebrations of small-town American life that are quite as rich, as warm, and as complexly layered, at least within recent years. He put it on his Top 10 of the 2010-2019 decade.

In a positive review in Slate, Dana Stevens lauded the performances of the three leads, saying that both Black and McConaughey are at their best when working with Linklater. But she reserved her highest praise for "the good people of Carthage, who, sitting on porches or the hoods of their cars, recount the strange story of Bernie Tiede and Marjorie Nugent".

Marc Savlov of The Austin Chronicle said:
If I hadn't already read Skip Hollandsworth's Texas Monthly article recounting the tragicomic tale of Carthage's assistant funeral director Bernie Tiede, I'd swear this film adaptation was based on one of Joe R. Lansdale's East Texas gothics. As ever, truth proves itself stranger than fiction and the human heart (which is stranger and more inscrutable than anything). And Jack Black redeems himself (for Gulliver's Travels, among other things) with a subtly quirky performance that's one of his personal best.

Gregory Ellwood of HitFix said the film is "not as funny as Linklater wants it to be...". But he praised Black's performance: "Black is simply great... making you believe someone like Bernie could really exist and while accenting his funny characteristics also portraying him as three-dimensional character."

Eric Kohn of indieWIRE called it "an oddly endearing love letter to Southern eccentricities". He found the film hard to categorize, saying: "Bernie is a shape-shifting genre vehicle set apart from anything else in Linklater’s career. There’s a loose sensibility to this mockumentary—mysterious comedy? comedic mystery? It’s tough to categorize as anything beyond an enjoyable experience."

Mary Pols, writing in Time, gave the film an unfavorable review: "You would be hard pressed to find a film that feels more true to a reporter’s experience of an event. This isn’t necessarily a good thing, at least not cinematically... The movie translation is playful and cunning but never escapes the reportorial trap; observation after the fact rarely matches the energy of experience... The big problem with playing this same note over and over again is that while the pairing of an 81-year-old harridan and the 39-year-old effeminate mensch, whether off on a cruise together or dining at the local taqueria, may sound funny, it’s mostly just sad."

Owen Gleiberman of Entertainment Weekly ranked the film as one of the top ten films of 2012, calling it a "deviously droll light-comic tabloid docudrama".

Local response
The film divided citizens of Carthage. In the film, Linklater includes interviews with several Carthage residents about their feelings of support for Bernie Tiede. Some citizens hope the film will stimulate an increase in tourism, while others have voiced anger that a comedy film was derived from the events surrounding the murder of an 81-year-old woman.

"You can't make a dark comedy out of a murder," says Panola County District Attorney Danny Buck Davidson (portrayed in the film by McConaughey). "This movie is not historically accurate," adds Davidson, who says that Nugent's story is missing. "The movie does not tell her side of the story."

"If it was fiction it might be funny, but this was a real person in a real town and no, I don't think it's funny at all," says Carthage resident Toni Clements, who knew both Tiede and Nugent.

Owners of the Hawthorn Funeral Home in Carthage, where Tiede met Nugent, refused to allow the film to use the name of the funeral home. “We felt we did not want the Hawthorn Funeral Home name or family name thought of in a dark comedy... you always know locally these are real people and families so there is a sting.”

"I've now seen the movie Bernie twice and, except for a few insignificant details ... it tells the story pretty much the way it happened," Joe Rhodes, Nugent's nephew, wrote in The New York Times Magazine shortly before the film's general release. Rod, Nugent's only child, did not return his calls. His lawyer sent Rhodes a letter strongly suggesting the possibility of legal action for his remarks. Rhodes said, "I guarantee he [Rod] won't like it."

Accolades
Bernie earned nominations for Best Feature and Best Ensemble Performance at the 2012 Gotham Awards. At the 2012 Independent Spirit Awards, the film was nominated for Best Feature and Black was nominated for Best Male Lead.

The National Board of Review included Bernie in their Top 10 Independent Films. The Broadcast Film Critics Association nominated Bernie for Best Comedy, Black for Best Actor in a Comedy, and MacLaine for Best Actress in a Comedy.

A reader survey by the Los Angeles Times ranked it as the "most under-appreciated" film of 2012, from a shortlist of seven films selected by the newspaper.

Bernie won Rotten Tomatoes' 14th annual Golden Tomato award for the best reviewed comedy released in 2012.

Jack Black's performance as Tiede earned him a Golden Globe nomination for Best Actor in a Musical or Comedy.

Matthew McConaughey's portrayal of Danny Buck Davidson received several nominations and won for Best Supporting Actor from the New York Film Critics Circle and from the National Society of Film Critics.

Influence
Having seen the film, Austin-based attorney Jodi Cole met with director, Richard Linklater, for further information about the case. After meeting with Tiede at the prison, she began work on a habeas corpus petition in his case, raising issues not addressed in his previous direct appeal. Tiede was released from his life sentence in May 2014 on $10,000 bail, with the condition that he live with Linklater in Austin, Texas.

Nugent's granddaughter expressed shock that the release was granted, suggesting that it was due to the film's portrayal of Tiede.

On January 2, 2015, an Austin, Texas news channel reported that the district attorney agreed to release Tiede and was not ruling out a future prosecution. Panola County prosecutor Danny Buck Davidson said that he had met members of Marjorie Nugent's family. He believed the film led to successful efforts to have Tiede paroled early from a life sentence. Out on bond, Tiede was due back in court March 2015.

Davidson eventually agreed that Tiede was wrongly sentenced for first-degree murder when he deserved a lesser sentence. On April 22, 2016, after a resentencing hearing in Henderson, Texas, a jury deliberated for four-and-a-half hours. They sentenced Tiede to serve a prison term of 99 years to life.

Footnote
	
 The "Castle Rock Entertainment" logo and in-credit text does not appear in this film's opening.

References

External links
 
 
 
 
 
 

Panola County, Texas
2011 black comedy films
2010s crime comedy films
2011 films
American biographical films
American black comedy films
American crime comedy films
American independent films
2011 independent films
American mockumentary films
Biographical films about criminals
Castle Rock Entertainment films
Comedy films based on actual events
2010s English-language films
Films based on newspaper and magazine articles
Films directed by Richard Linklater
Films set in 1996
Films set in Texas
Films shot in Texas
Mandalay Pictures films
Crime films based on actual events
2010s American films